Acanthofrontia atricosta is a moth of the subfamily Arctiinae. It was described by George Hampson in 1918. It is found in the Gambia.

References

Moths described in 1918
Erebid moths of Africa
Lithosiini